Peuceptyelus is a genus of true bugs belonging to the family Aphrophoridae.

The species of this genus are found in Northern Europe and Japan.

Species:
 Peuceptyelus bufonius Jacobi, 1921 
 Peuceptyelus burmanicus (Distant, 1908)

References

Aphrophoridae